Ambroise Oyongo Bitolo (born 22 June 1991) is a Cameroonian professional footballer who plays as a left-back for the Cameroon national team.

Club career

Coton Sport 
Ambroise Oyongo began his career with Moussango FC of Yaoundé in 2008. His play with Moussango attracted the interest of top club Coton Sport FC who signed him in July 2010. He quickly established himself at the club winning the league title in his first year with Coton Sport. In 2011, he helped the club to the league and cup double. In 2013, he won another league title and helped lead Coton Sport to the semi-finals of the 2013 CAF Champions League.

New York Red Bulls 
During the 2013 season, Oyongo went on trial with French side Lille and it was reported that he would be joining the Ligue 1 side during the 2014 January transfer window. The move never materialised and in January 2014 Oyongo went on trial with New York Red Bulls. He impressed during his trial and on 7 March 2014, he officially signed with the club. In his first season with New York, the versatile Oyongo was a key player for the club during the second half of the season as he made starts at both left-back and in midfield helping his side qualify for the league playoffs. On 30 October 2014, Oyongo assisted on Bradley Wright-Phillips winning goal in the last minute of the match helping New York defeat Sporting Kansas City and advance to the Eastern Conference Semifinals.

Montreal Impact 
On 27 January 2015, Oyongo was traded to Montreal Impact with Eric Alexander, an international player roster spot and allocation money for Felipe and the 1st pick in the MLS allocation ranking.

Montpellier 
Oyongo's contract expired at the end of the 2017 season, and he opted to move to Europe rather than renewing his deal with Montreal. He signed with French club Montpellier in December 2017.

On 22 February 2021, he moved on loan to Krasnodar in Russian Premier League until the end of the 2020–21 season. He made his debut for Krasnodar on 28 February 2021 in a Russian Premier League game against Ural Yekaterinburg, when he substituted injured Yevgeni Chernov in the 33rd minute. However, at half-time, Oyongo had to be substituted due to injury himself. On 4 March 2021, his agent announced that he will have to be operated on in Spain and will not be able to play for Krasnodar for the duration of the loan and will not return to the club. Krasnodar paid all of the salary due in advance at that time.

International career
Oyongo played for Cameroon at the 2011 FIFA U-20 World Cup. On 28 July 2013 he made his debut with the Cameroon senior team, starting in a 1–0 victory over Gabon at Stade Ahmadou Ahidjo.

At the 2015 Africa Cup of Nations, Oyongo scored his first international goal in a 1–1 draw against Mali on 20 January 2015. He was named in Cameroon's squad for the 2017 FIFA Confederations Cup but was later ruled out of the tournament after suffering a ruptured patellar tendon during a 1–0 win over Morocco on 10 June.

Career statistics

International

Scores and results list Cameroon's goal tally first, score column indicates score after each Oyongo goal.

Honours
Coton Sport
Elite One: 2010, 2011, 2013
Cameroon Cup: 2011

Cameroon
Africa Cup of Nations: 2017
Africa Cup of Nations bronze: 2021

References

External links
 
 
 WestAfricanFootball.com profile
 
 

1991 births
Living people
Association football defenders
Cameroonian footballers
People from Centre Region (Cameroon)
Cameroonian expatriate footballers
Expatriate soccer players in the United States
Cameroonian expatriate sportspeople in the United States
Expatriate soccer players in Canada
Cameroonian expatriate sportspeople in Canada
Expatriate footballers in France
Cameroonian expatriate sportspeople in France
Expatriate footballers in Russia
Cameroonian expatriate sportspeople in Russia
Coton Sport FC de Garoua players
New York Red Bulls players
CF Montréal players
Montpellier HSC players
FC Krasnodar players
Elite One players
Major League Soccer players
Ligue 1 players
Russian Premier League players
Cameroon international footballers
Cameroon under-20 international footballers
2015 Africa Cup of Nations players
2017 Africa Cup of Nations players
2017 FIFA Confederations Cup players
2019 Africa Cup of Nations players
Oyongo
2021 Africa Cup of Nations players